Duke Xi may refer to these ancient Chinese rulers:
 
Duke Xi of Chen (died 796 BC)
Duke Xi of Qi (died 698 BC)
Duke Xi of Lu (died 627 BC)

See also
King Xi (disambiguation)